Alan Robert Haworth, Baron Haworth (born 26 April 1948, Blackburn) is an English Labour Party politician.

Early life
Alan Haworth was educated at St Silas, CoE School, Blackburn and Blackburn Technical & Grammar School. He attended the University of St Andrews to study medicine, but left after one year's study. He then studied for a BSc Hons (London external) degree in sociology at North East London Polytechnic, from which he graduated in 1971.

Parliamentary career
Haworth was appointed to the staff of the Parliamentary Labour Party in 1974, and was Secretary of the PLP from 1992 to 2004. He was elevated to the House of Lords on 28 June 2004 as a life peer taking the title Baron Haworth, of Fisherfield in Ross and Cromarty.

In December 2009 Lord Haworth was accused by a newspaper of earning £100,000 in expenses by pretending that his main home was a cottage in Scotland . Following an investigation by the senior accounting officer in the House of Lords - the Clerk of the Parliaments - Lord Haworth was completely cleared of any wrongdoing in February 2010.

See also
 Dundonnell and Fisherfield Forest

Writings
He is the author of 113 obituaries of former Labour MPs, some published in Politico's Book of the Dead 2003, and the joint editor (with Dianne Hayter) of Men who Made Labour, obituaries of the first 29 Labour MPs elected to Parliament in 1906.

References

1948 births
Living people
Labour Party (UK) life peers
People from Blackburn
Alumni of the University of St Andrews
Life peers created by Elizabeth II